Ceratozamia mirandae is a species of cycad in the family Zamiaceae endemic to Chiapas and Oaxaca, Mexico. It is found on the slopes of the Sierra Madre de Chiapas and Sierra de Niltepec, near La Tigria (La Tigrilla).

References

Whitelock, Loran M. 2002. The Cycads. Portland: Timber Press.

External links
 * 

mirandae
Flora of Mexico